Pertti Pousi (born 24 June 1946) is a Finnish athlete. He competed in the men's long jump and the men's triple jump at the 1968 Summer Olympics.

References

1946 births
Living people
Athletes (track and field) at the 1968 Summer Olympics
Finnish male long jumpers
Finnish male triple jumpers
Olympic athletes of Finland
Place of birth missing (living people)
Universiade silver medalists for Finland
Universiade bronze medalists for Finland
Universiade medalists in athletics (track and field)
Medalists at the 1967 Summer Universiade